Ali Mobasheri is a Professor of Musculoskeletal Physiology at University of Surrey in England.  He was educated at Dulwich College an independent school for boys in Dulwich, southeast London and is included on the List of Old Alleynians. He obtained his BSc from Imperial College London, his MSc from the University of Toronto and his DPhil from Wolfson College, Oxford at the University of Oxford. He has published more than 250 papers  in leading scientific journals.

Selected bibliography
Facilitative Glucose Transporters in Articular Chondrocytes (2008)
Diverse Roles of Integrin Receptors in Articular Cartilage  (2008)
Potassium ion channels in articular chondrocytes. Putative roles in mechanotransduction, metabolic regulation and cell proliferation. In: Mechanosensitive Ion Channels  (2008)
Applications of tissue microarrays in renal physiology and pathology. In: Renal and Urinary Proteomics: Methods and Protocols'  (2010)Nutraceuticals: from Research to Legal and Regulatory Affairs. In: Nonpharmacological Therapies in the Management of Osteoarthritis (2011)From Multipotent Cells to Fully Differentiated Connective Tissue Cells for Regenerative Medicine: Emerging Applications of Mesenchymal Stem Cells. In: Regenerative Medicine and Tissue Engineering: Cells and Biomaterials (2011)Three-Dimensional, High-Density and Tissue Engineered Culture Models of Articular Cartilage. In: Replacing animal models: a practical guide to creating and using biomimetic alternatives'' (2012)

References

External links
 Profile at the University of Surrey Website
 Profile on LinkedIn
 Profile on Scopus - Author ID: 7003311894

Alumni of Imperial College London
Academics of the University of Nottingham
Academics of the University of Surrey
British physiologists
British people of Iranian descent
Living people
University of Toronto alumni
Alumni of Wolfson College, Oxford
Year of birth missing (living people)
Iranian physiologists